The 7.63 mm Mannlicher or 7.65 mm Mannlicher is a centerfire pistol cartridge developed for the Steyr Mannlicher M1901 pistol.  This military pistol was rejected by the Austrian Ministry of War, but was often carried as a private weapon by officers.  England began manufacturing ammunition when the Mannlicher pistol became popular in South America.  Germany began manufacturing ammunition after World War I, but identified the ammunition as 7.65 Mannlicher to differentiate it from the 7.63×25mm Mauser cartridge.  This cartridge headspaces on the mouth of the case.

References

Pistol and rifle cartridges